Mansab may refer to :

 Mansabdar, sort of a military pay grade in the Mughal empire
 Mansab, Yemen